Queensferry railway station was a railway station located in Queensferry, Flintshire, Wales on the south bank of the canalised section of the River Dee.

History
Opened on 1 May 1848 as part of the Chester and Holyhead Railway (now the North Wales Coast Line), it was one of the first stations on the line. Originally named Queen's Ferry, the station had two lines running through it but the stretch was quadrupled in the late 19th century. At its peak there were four platforms although two platforms were removed long before closure.

Goods services were halted 4 May 1964 and passenger services 14 February 1966. In the 1980s the number of tracks running through the abandoned site were reduced back down to two. Although most of the station building have gone one platform and the ticket office remain in situ.

References

Further reading

Disused railway stations in Flintshire
Former London and North Western Railway stations
Railway stations in Great Britain opened in 1848
Railway stations in Great Britain closed in 1966
Beeching closures in Wales